Yugo Araki (20 March 1925 – 2 September 2012) was a Japanese equestrian. He competed at the 1960 Summer Olympics and the 1968 Summer Olympics.

References

1925 births
2012 deaths
Japanese male equestrians
Olympic equestrians of Japan
Equestrians at the 1960 Summer Olympics
Equestrians at the 1968 Summer Olympics
Sportspeople from Kyoto
20th-century Japanese people